Jacob Zeilin (July 16, 1806 – November 18, 1880) was the United States Marine Corps' first non-brevet flag officer. He served as the seventh commandant of the United States Marine Corps, from 1864 to 1876.

Early life and education
Zeilin was born in Philadelphia on July 16, 1806. He attended the United States Military Academy from 1822 to 1825, but dropped out due to poor grades in philosophy and chemistry.

Career
Zeilin was commissioned in the Marine Corps as a second lieutenant on October 1, 1831. After completing the preliminary training of a Marine officer in Washington, D.C., Zeilin's first tours of duty were ashore at the Marine Barracks, Philadelphia, and at Gosport, Virginia. He first went to sea on board the sloop of war  in March 1832, which was followed by a tour of duty at Charlestown (Boston), Massachusetts. In August 1834, he again joined the sloop Erie on a long and eventful voyage which lasted for more than three years. He was promoted to first lieutenant on 12 September 1836.

From September 1837 to April 1841, Zeilin again served at Charlestown, Massachusetts, and New York. Upon the conclusion of this tour of sea duty, and after again serving at important Marine Corps stations on the east coast of the United States from 1842 to 1845, he was transferred to duty aboard the frigate  of the U.S. Pacific Squadron.

Mexican–American War
During the Mexican–American War, Zeilin commanded the Marine Detachment embarked in Congress, which ship was attached to Commodore Robert F. Stockton's force. He took part in the conquest of California (1846–1847) and was brevetted to the rank of major (two grades above his rank at the time) for gallantry during the action at the San Gabriel River crossing on January 9, 1847. Later, he took part in the capture of Los Angeles and in the Battle of La Mesa.

On 28 January 1847, Zeilin was appointed Military Commandant of San Diego and served in that capacity until the completion of the conquest of California. He was promoted to the regular rank of captain on 14 September 1847. During the following few months, Zeilin, with the Marines of the Pacific Squadron, participated in the capture of important ports in lower California and the west coast of Mexico, and served as Fleet Marine Officer of the Pacific Squadron. In September 1847, he served with the forces that captured Guaymas and those that met the enemy at San Jose on the 30th. For the remainder of the war, Mazatlán was his center of activity, and he fought in several skirmishes with the Mexicans in that area.

Interwar period
After the close of the war with Mexico, Zeilin proceeded to Norfolk, Virginia, where he served for a time, then to New York. He remained at New York until June 1852. With elaborate ceremonies, the Marines under his command took a prominent part in the expedition. He was the second person to set foot on shore at the formal landing of the naval forces at Kurihama, Yokosuka, Japan on 14 July 1853, and was one of those later accorded special honor for his part in the expedition that opened the doors of Japan to the outside world.

Upon his return from Japan, he was again stationed at Norfolk. This duty was followed by his being placed in command of the Marine Barracks of the Washington Navy Yard. After remaining for a time at Washington, he again went to sea, this time aboard the frigate , on the European Station, until 1859.

American Civil War
During the early part of the American Civil War, Zeilin was on garrison duty in command of Marine Barracks, firstly at Philadelphia and later at Washington, D.C. Five days later, he was appointed to the regular rank of major.  On July 21, 1861, he commanded a company of U.S. Marines during the First Battle of Bull Run and received a slight wound.

In 1863, Zeilin was given command of the battalion of U.S. Marines sent to support the naval force whose mission was the capture of Charleston, South Carolina, but, because of illness, he returned after a few weeks of this duty to garrison duty at Marine Barracks, Portsmouth, New Hampshire.  Later, he returned to sea, serving with the South Atlantic Blockading Squadron under Rear Admiral John Dahlgren. In 1864, Zeilin assumed command of the Marine Barracks at Portsmouth, New Hampshire.

Commandant of the Marine Corps
On June 10, 1864, he was appointed Colonel Commandant of the Marine Corps in the rank of colonel. His faithful and efficient performance of the duties of Commandant of the Marine Corps during the trying period of the last year of the war and those years immediately following the close of the war is evidenced by the fact that he was promoted to the rank of brigadier general on 2 March 1867. Upon his promotion, he became the Marine Corps' first general officer.

After the war, Brigadier General Zeilin successfully defended the Marine Corps against its critics. In 1868, Zeilin approved of the design of the "Eagle, Globe, and Anchor," as the emblem for the Marine Corps. It replaced the previous emblem which was a bugle with a letter "M" in the middle.

Zeilin retired from the Marine Corps on November 1, 1876 after serving over forty-five years as a Marine Corps officer. When considering his time at West Point, he served over 49 years in uniform.

Personal life

Zeilin married Virginia Freeman on October 22, 1845. Together they had one son, William Freeman Zeilin (1851-1880) and two daughters, Margaret Freeman Very (1850-1911) (wife of Edward Wilson Very) and Anne V. Stockton (wife of one of Senator John P. Stockton's sons).

General Zeilin was a member of the Pennsylvania Commandery of the Military Order of the Loyal Legion of the United States, a military society of officers who served in the Union armed forces.

On 18 November 1880, he died in Washington, D.C. He is buried in Laurel Hill Cemetery in Philadelphia.

Legacy
He is the namesake for Zeilin Road, on Marine Corps Base Quantico in Virginia.
He is the namesake for Zeilin Street, on Marine Corps Base Camp Pendleton in California.

References

External links
 

1806 births
1880 deaths
Military personnel from Philadelphia
American military personnel of the Mexican–American War
People of Pennsylvania in the American Civil War
Union Marines
United States Marine Corps Commandants
United States Marine Corps generals
Burials at Laurel Hill Cemetery (Philadelphia)